Johnny Greaves may refer to:
Johnny Greaves (boxer), English boxer
Johnny Greaves (racing driver), American racing driver
Johnny Greaves (rugby league), Australian rugby league player